Chul (also Romanized as Chūl) is a village in Keshvar Rural District, Papi District, Khorramabad County, Lorestan Province, Iran. At the 2006 census, its population was 47, in 9 families.

References 

Towns and villages in Khorramabad County